The name Helga has been used for three tropical cyclones in the Eastern Pacific Ocean:

 Hurricane Helga (1966)
 Tropical Storm Helga (1970)
 Tropical Storm Helga (1974)

Pacific hurricane set index articles